Pseudaonidiina is a subtribe of armored scale insects.

Genera
Aspidonymus
Diaphoraspis
Diaspidopus
Diastolaspis
Dichosoma
Duplaspidiotus
Eulaingia
Gomphaspidiotus
Icaraspidiotus
Mimeraspis
Myrtophila
Neomorgania
Operculaspis
Paraonidia
Parrottia
Pseudaonidia
Pseudaonidiella
Pseudotargionia
Sadaotakagia
Semelaspidus

References

Aspidiotini